Northampton Area School District is a public school district located in Northampton County, Pennsylvania in the Lehigh Valley region of eastern Pennsylvania.

Students in grades nine through 12 attend Northampton Area High School in Northampton. Students in grades six through eight attend Northampton Area Middle School, and the district maintains four elementary schools, Northampton Borough, George Wolf, Lehigh, and Moore, for kindergarten through fifth grade. As of the 2021–22 school year, the school district had a total enrollment of 5,284 students between all six of its schools, according to National Center for Education Statistics data. 
 
Northampton Area School District is located in the heart of the Lehigh Valley.  Covering  in Northampton County, the school district comprises the boroughs of Bath, Chapman and Northampton; and the townships of Allen, East Allen, Lehigh, and Moore.  The population of the district is more than 38,500.

There is easy access to major roadways, including the Pennsylvania Turnpike Northeast Extension, Interstate 78, Route 22, Route 145, Route 329, and Route 248.
 
The borough of Northampton was the location of the former cement giant, The Atlas Portland Cement Company.

High school
Northampton Area High School is located in the borough of Northampton, Pennsylvania. Enrollment is approximately 1,800 students for 9th through 12th grades. The average graduating class is 430 students. The high school was constructed in 1963.

Middle school
The Northampton Area Middle School is located in the Borough of Northampton. Enrollment is approximately 1800 students in 6th, 7th and 8th grades.

Elementary schools
Northampton Area School District has five elementary school buildings to comprise four elementary schools, Northampton Borough, George Wolf, Lehigh, and Moore, for kindergarten through fifth grade. 
 
Total elementary school enrollment in the school district is approximately 2,900.

Schools
Northampton Area High School
Northampton Area Middle School
George Wolf Elementary School
Lehigh Elementary School
Moore Elementary School
Northampton Borough Elementary School

External links
Northampton Area School District official website
Northampton Area School District on Facebook
Northampton Area School District on Twitter

School districts in Northampton County, Pennsylvania